Anna Frances Toman  (born 29 April 1993) is an English field hockey player who plays as a midfielder or defender for SCHC and the England and Great Britain national teams.

Club career

Toman plays club hockey in the Dutch Hoofdklasse for SCHC.

She has also played for Wimbledon, Uni of Birmingham and Belper.

International career
Toman made her senior international debut for England against South Africa on 25 February 2017.

References

External links

 
 Anna Toman at Great Britain Hockey
 Anna Toman at England Hockey
 
 
 
 

1993 births
Living people
English female field hockey players
Female field hockey defenders
Female field hockey midfielders
Olympic field hockey players of Great Britain
Olympic bronze medallists for Great Britain
Olympic medalists in field hockey
Field hockey players at the 2020 Summer Olympics
Medalists at the 2020 Summer Olympics
Commonwealth Games medallists in field hockey
Commonwealth Games bronze medallists for England
Field hockey players at the 2018 Commonwealth Games
Sportspeople from Derby
Wimbledon Hockey Club players
Women's England Hockey League players
University of Birmingham Hockey Club players
SCHC players
Medallists at the 2018 Commonwealth Games